The 1960–61 season was the 37th season in the existence of AEK Athens F.C. and the second consecutive season in the top flight of Greek football. They competed in the Alpha Ethniki, the Greek Cup and the Balkans Cup. The season began on 18 September 1960 and finished on 25 June 1961.

Overview

AEK Athens continued this season with one of their "Patriarchs", Tryfon Tzanetis in the technical leadership, who was officially hired in January with the task of revitalizing the team. However, his predecessor, Lukas Aurednik, remained in the team and alongside Christos Ribas formed a coaching triumvirate with Tzanetis apparently having the first say, but Auretnik maintaining the tactical support and the acceptance of the vast majority of the fans. Aurednik promoted the team's future star, Spyros Pomonis from their academies, while the additions of Thanasis Gouvas from A.E. Messolonghi and Aris Tsachouridis from Makedonikos were also noteworthy.

The first objections to the objectivity of the referees begun and made their appearance in Greek football, culminating in the Athenian derby, in the following matchday. Three days before the match there was strong dissatisfaction with the presence of certain people from Panathinaikos in the central arbitration committee. AEK was severely wronged by the referee Ioannidis and the dissatisfaction was confirmed since the referee denied an obvious penalty to Nestoridis in the 87th minute and while the score was 2–2. In the tension that followed, the referee showed Anastasiadis a red card and the refusal of the latter to come out of the pitch resulted in the game being awarded to Panathinaikos and AEK being zeroed. Another 2 consecutive defeats followed, which kept AEK away from the top. The incidents with the referees continued, with the suspension of the match against Proodeftiki and its resumption 4 months later, as on 18 February in Karaiskakis Stadium, at the 80th minute, while the game was at 1–1, Gouvas scored a goal where the ball hit the inner post at the bottom of the goal and went out again with The referee Bakirzis indicating "play on", considering that the ball hit the post. A scuffle between players followed on the pitch and after several incidents the referee called it off and it was repeated on 14 June, when AEK was indifferent and mathematically out of the title. In the rest of the season, the team briought mediocre results, losing in both matches to the then strong Panionios, while they achieved a 4–1 victory over Olympiacos. The 27 goals scored by Kostas Nestoridis, who emerged again as the top scorer of the league, did not manage to give AEK anything better than fourth place.

AEK entered the Cup facing AE Kaisarianis in December and they achieved one of the highest scoring victories in their history with 9–0. In the next round they eliminated Agioi Anargyroi easily with 5–1 and then Doxa Metaxourgio with 3–2. Afterwards they played against PAO Kalogreza and eliminated them with 2–1 and in the next round they faced Niki Plakas and won with a triumphant 8–1. In the round of 32, AEK came across Prasina Poulia, one of the historic teams from Kalamata, who would competed in Athens for the first time. The match was held under intense emotional charge due to the presence of Kleanthis Maropoulos and the Messinian team held a historic 2–2 draw until the 60th minute, when AEK "woke up" and in the end the result was a satisfying 7–3. In the round of 16, they easily eliminated Proodetiki by 4–1, but in the quarter-finals, Iraklis ended their course in the institution, by winning them with 1–0 in Thessaloniki.

Players

Squad information

NOTE: The players are the ones that have been announced by the AEK Athens' press release. No edits should be made unless a player arrival or exit is announced. Updated 30 June 1961, 23:59 UTC+2.

Transfers

In

Out

Renewals

Overall transfer activity

Expenditure:  ₯0

Income:  ₯0

Net Total:  ₯0

Pre-season and friendlies

Alpha Ethniki

League table

Results summary

Results by Matchday

Fixtures

Greek Cup

Matches

Balkans Cup

Matches

Statistics

Squad statistics

! colspan="11" style="background:#FFDE00; text-align:center" | Goalkeepers
|-

! colspan="11" style="background:#FFDE00; color:black; text-align:center;"| Defenders
|-

! colspan="11" style="background:#FFDE00; color:black; text-align:center;"| Midfielders
|-

! colspan="11" style="background:#FFDE00; color:black; text-align:center;"| Forwards
|-

|}

Disciplinary record

|-
! colspan="17" style="background:#FFDE00; text-align:center" | Goalkeepers

|-
! colspan="17" style="background:#FFDE00; color:black; text-align:center;"| Defenders

|-
! colspan="17" style="background:#FFDE00; color:black; text-align:center;"| Midfielders

|-
! colspan="17" style="background:#FFDE00; color:black; text-align:center;"| Forwards

|-
|}

References

External links
AEK Athens F.C. Official Website

AEK Athens F.C. seasons
AEK Athens